The 2022–23 EHF Champions League knockout stage will begin on 22 March with the playoffs and end on 18 June 2023 with the final at the Lanxess Arena in Cologne, Germany, to decide the winners of the 2022–23 EHF Champions League. A total of twelve teams will compete in the knockout phase.

Format
In the playoffs, the eight teams ranked 2nd–6th in Groups A and B play against each other in two-legged home-and-away matches. The four winning teams advance to the quarterfinals, where they are joined by the top-two teams of Groups A and B for another round of two-legged home-and-away matches. The four quarterfinal winners qualify for the final four tournament at the Lanxess Arena in Cologne, Germany.

Qualified teams
The top six teams from Groups A and B qualified for the knockout stage.

All times are UTC+2 (matches on 22 and 23 March are UTC+1).

Playoffs

Overview

|}

Matches

Quarterfinals

Overview

|}

Matches

Final four
The final four will be held at the Lanxess Arena in Cologne, Germany on 17 and 18 June 2023.

Bracket

Semifinals

Third place game

Final

References

External links
Official website

knockout stage